Daniel James Caddy (born 19 March 1973) is an Australian politician.

At the 2021 Western Australian state election, Caddy was elected to the Western Australian Legislative Council as a Labor member for North Metropolitan.

References 

Living people
Members of the Western Australian Legislative Council
Australian Labor Party members of the Parliament of Western Australia
21st-century Australian politicians
1973 births